The 1920 Southern Intercollegiate Athletic Association football season was the college football games played by the member schools of the Southern Intercollegiate Athletic Association as part of the 1920 college football season.  The season began on September 23 with conference member Auburn hosting the Marion Military Institute.

Georgia and Georgia Tech both claim conference championships with undefeated records, as would Tulane. Clyde Berryman retroactively selected Georgia as a national champion.

Regular season

SIAA teams in bold.

Week One

Week Two

Week Three

Week Four

Week Five

Week Six

Week Seven

Week Eight

Week Nine

Week Ten

Week Eleven

Awards and honors

All-Americans

E – Bill Fincher, Georgia Tech (WC-1, LP-1 [as T])
G – Dummy Lebey, Georgia Tech (LP-2)
QB – Bo McMillin, Centre (FW; INS-3; WC-2; UP-2; WE-1; NEA-1; LP-2 [hb])
HB – Buck Flowers, Georgia Tech (UP-3 [hb]; INS-3)

All-Southern team

The following includes the composite All-Southern eleven formed by the selection of 27 coaches and sporting writers culled by the  Atlanta Constitution and Atlanta Journal.

References